Macledium zeyheri is a species of flowering plant in the family Asteraceae. It is found in South Africa, especially along the Natal coast. Its natural habitats are subtropical or tropical dry shrubland and plantations.

Traditional uses 
The powdered roots of M. zeyheri are traditionally ascribed medical value, and are used to treat stomach disorders in both livestock and people.

Gallery

References

Further reading 
 KwaZulu-Natal Wild Flowers by Elsa Pooley, p. 446.
 Lawalrée, A. & Mvukiyumwami, J. 1982. Le genre Dicoma Cassini (Asteraceae) en Afrique centrale. Bulletin du Jardin Botanique National de Belgique 52: 151–163.

Dicoma
Flora of South Africa